Lewis Fields Linn (November 5, 1796October 3, 1843) was a physician and politician who represented his home state of Missouri in the United States Senate from 1833 to his death.

Early life
Linn was born near Louisville, Kentucky on November 5, 1796.  He received a meager academic education because of the deaths of his parents.  He was raised by his older half-brother, Henry Dodge and began studying medicine in Louisville.  During the War of 1812 he served as a surgeon with troops commanded by Henry Dodge, though he was still a teenager; after the war he completed his studies at Philadelphia Medical College in 1816. Linn is among the hundreds of members of Congress who were slaveowners.

Career
Linn was admitted to practice as a medical doctor and subsequently relocated to Ste. Genevieve, Missouri.  Early in his career he earned recognition for his major role in combating two cholera epidemics.

He served in the Missouri Senate in 1827.  In 1832 he was appointed to the state commission which settled land claims based on grants made by the government of France prior to the Missouri Territory becoming part of the United States.

In 1833 Linn was elected to the United States Senate as a Jacksonian, filling the vacancy created by the death of Alexander Buckner.  He was reelected as a Democrat in 1836 and 1842, and served from October 25, 1833 until his death.  During his Senate career Linn was chairman of the Committee on Private Land Claims from 1835 to 1841 (Twenty-fourth through Twenty-sixth Congresses), and the Committee on Agriculture from 1841 to 1843 (Twenty-seventh Congress).

Death and burial
Linn died in Ste. Genevieve, Missouri on October 3, 1843.  He was buried at Ste. Genevieve Memorial Cemetery.

Legacy
Four states have counties named after him: Iowa, Kansas, Missouri, and Oregon.

The towns of Linneus, Missouri, Linn, Missouri, West Linn, Oregon, and Linnton, Oregon were also named in Linn's honor.

Family
Linn was the brother-in-law of James Hugh Relfe, half brother of Henry Dodge and uncle of Henry's son Augustus C. Dodge.  He was the uncle of William Pope McArthur, a United States Navy officer who was notable for his surveys of the Pacific Coast.

See also
List of United States Congress members who died in office (1790–1899)

References

External links

1796 births
1843 deaths
American military personnel of the War of 1812
Missouri Democratic-Republicans
Missouri Jacksonians
Missouri state senators
Democratic-Republican Party United States senators
Democratic Party United States senators from Missouri
Politicians from Louisville, Kentucky
Military personnel from Kentucky
Physicians from Kentucky
Physicians from Missouri